The French Riviera Masters was a men's senior (over 50) professional golf tournament on the European Senior Tour. It was held from 2010 to 2015 on the French Riviera. In 2010 and 2011 it was called the Cannes Mougins Masters and was held at Golf de Cannes-Mougins in Mougins, Cannes, before moving to Terre Blanche Hotel Spa Golf Resort, Tourrettes, Var, just southeast of Fayence. The 2015 winner was Simon P. Brown who won the first prize of €60,000 out of total prize-money of €400,000.

Winners

External links
Coverage on the European Senior Tour's official site

Former European Senior Tour events
Defunct golf tournaments in France
Recurring sporting events established in 2010
Recurring sporting events disestablished in 2015